John O'Nialain also recorded as John O'Neylan was an Irish Roman Catholic clergyman in the 16th century: he was appointed Bishop of Kilfenora by Pope Paul III on 21 November 1541; and died in 1572.

References

1572 deaths
Bishops of Kilfenora